John O. "Kick" Kelly (October 31, 1856 – March 27, 1926), also nicknamed "Honest John" and "Diamond John," was an American catcher, manager and umpire in Major League Baseball who went on to become a boxing referee and to run gambling houses in his native New York City. He made a notable impact on the development of umpiring, helping to pioneer the use of multiple umpires in games in the 1880s.

Playing career
He played in 16 total games, had a .155 batting average, and scored five runs.

Umpiring career
After his playing days were over, Kelly became an umpire, working games in both the National League and the American Association. He returned to the NL in 1888. The early years of the major leagues were particularly hard on umpires, with hostile crowds and vicious arguments, in addition to the difficulty of constantly working games single-handedly. Few officials lasted more than two or three seasons, and by the end of the  campaign Kelly had passed Billy McLean's total of 317 major league games as an umpire.

Among the highlights of his officiating career was he called two no-hitters. The first game came on September 20,  when he called balls and strikes for Chicago White Stockings star pitcher Larry Corcoran, who tossed the second of his three career no-hitters, and on September 18,  when future Hall of Famer Cy Young threw the first of his three career no-hitters.

He finished his umpiring career in 1897, after eight seasons and 626 games. Following the 1887 season, Kelly and NL official John Gaffney officiated the 15-game World's Championship Series between the NL champion Detroit Wolverines and the AA champion St. Louis Browns. They devised a new system whereby one umpire would call balls and strikes behind the plate, while the other would make calls on the basepaths. The system was regarded as a great improvement over the 1886 attempt at the use of multiple umpires, in which two umpires were stationed behind the plate, with a third official – stationed behind the pitcher – who was allowed to intervene only to settle disagreements between the other two. In 1946, Kelly was one of 11 umpires named by the Baseball Hall of Fame to the Honor Rolls of Baseball.

Managerial career
Kick Kelly began his managerial career in 1887 when he took over the field duties for the Colonels. He managed the entire season, and the team compiled a 76–60 record, which was good for fourth place in the American Association. He then began the 1888 season as their manager, but the team started with a record of 10–29, and owner/general manager Mordecai Davidson fired Kelly and put himself at the helm in an attempt to stop the losing streak of which his team was in the middle. He and John Kerins did not help that much, as the team finished in seventh place.

Boxing career
Kelly became a championship boxing referee, officiating Jim Corbett's only successful defense of his heavyweight title against Charley Mitchell on January 25, 1894, in Jacksonville, Florida. In the second round, after Mitchell had begun the fight with constant slurs directed at Corbett, the champion landed a blow to Mitchell's head after he had been knocked to the mat. Mitchell's corner called for a foul, but the presence of numerous spectators brandishing guns and eager to defend their bets led Kelly to dismiss the complaint; he later confided that he had been lucky to leave Jacksonville alive. He also called the heavyweight fight between Corbett and Tom Sharkey on November 22, 1898, in New York, which ended in controversy when one of Corbett's cornermen jumped into the ring in the ninth round. Kelly announced that although Corbett had lost the fight on the foul, all bets were off. On July 3, 1899, in Buffalo, New York, Kelly refereed the bout in which Frank Erne won a 20-round decision to take the world lightweight title from Kid Lavigne.

Kelly died in Malba, Queens, at the age of 69, and is interred at the Calvary Cemetery in Woodside, New York.

References

External links

1856 births
1926 deaths
Louisville Colonels managers
Major League Baseball catchers
19th-century baseball players
19th-century baseball umpires
Syracuse Stars (NL) players
Troy Trojans players
American boxing referees
Baseball players from New York City
Burials at Calvary Cemetery (Queens)
Major League Baseball umpires